Junliangcheng is a town in the Dongli District of Tianjin in China.

Junliangcheng was included among the cities occupied by the Eight-Nation Alliance under the Boxer Protocol and was subsequently an important base for the Fengtian clique during China's Warlord era. As the headquarters for the Fengtian or Northeastern Army, it saw action in the First and Second Zhili–Fengtian Wars.

See also
 Junliangcheng North Railway Station

References

Towns in Tianjin